Acalyptris clinomochla is a moth of the family Nepticulidae. It was described by Edward Meyrick in 1934. It is known from Bombay, India and Sri Lanka. The hostplant for the species is Bridelia retusa.

References

Nepticulidae
Moths of Asia
Moths described in 1934